Bosco Puthur (born 28 May 1946) is a former Syro-Malabar Catholic bishop. He was born in Parappur, Kerala, India and is the Curia Bishop  of the Syro Malabar Church. Previously, he has served as Rector of Mangalapuzha Seminary|St. Joseph's Pontifical Seminary, Mangalapuzha. He was also a Monsignor of the Syro-Malabar Catholic Archdiocese of Thrissur. Following the sudden death of Mar Varkey Vithayathil, he has also served as the Administrator of the Major Archdiocese of Ernakulam-Angamaly and of the Syro-Malabar Church. On 11 January 2014, Puthur was appointed by Pope Francis as the bishop of the Eparchy of Melbourne of St. Thomas in Australia for Syro-Malabar Catholics. He was also appointed as the Apostolic Visitator of the Syro-Malabar faithful in New Zealand.

He became Bishop-emeritus, when Pope Francis appointed Mar John Panamthottahil as his successor.

References

External links

 Appointment as Auxiliary bishop
 Mar Bosco Puthur at Catholic hierarchy

1946 births
Syro-Malabar bishops
People from Malappuram district
Living people
Archdiocese of Thrissur
Archdiocese of Ernakulam-Angamaly
Catholic Church in Australia
Catholic Church in New Zealand